Lauren Smith-Fields (January 23, 1998 — December 12, 2021) was an African-American woman living in Bridgeport, Connecticut. On the morning of Sunday, December 12, 2021, she was allegedly found unresponsive in bed by her Bumble date, Matthew LaFountain.

Background 
Smith-Fields was aged 23 and on a date with a Bumble date, Matthew LaFountain, at the time of her death. He found her unresponsive at around 6 a.m. Immediately calling 9-1-1, he started chest compressions as advised by the operator. These efforts would prove to be unsuccessful and she was pronounced dead at the scene. First responders noted that her date seemed "shaken up" and in a state of shock. Her death was ultimately ruled an accidental overdose caused by Fentanyl and alcohol mixing.

Controversy 
Many people, including Smith-Fields' family, believe that the police department in charge of handling the case did not do enough or conduct a proper investigation. Some believe her date may be responsible for her death but he was cleared upon questioning, still Smith-Fields family feels the police department did not explore her date as a suspect far enough. Many say this incident did not receive as much attention or care as it would have if Smith-Fields were a white woman, calling this situation another example of institutionalized racism and a lack of care for black lives.

Aftermath 
Smith-Fields' family organized a protest outside of Morton Government Center and the detectives in charge of her case were put on leave and/or resigned. The case is still open and has been reassigned to other officers.

References

2021 deaths
Deaths by person in Connecticut
Unsolved deaths in the United States